Claudio Capelli (born 16 November 1986, Bern) is a Swiss male artistic gymnast and part of the national team. He represented his country at the 2008 and 2012 Summer Olympics. He also participated at the 2015 World Artistic Gymnastics Championships in Glasgow.

References

1986 births
Living people
Swiss male artistic gymnasts
Olympic gymnasts of Switzerland
Gymnasts at the 2008 Summer Olympics
Gymnasts at the 2012 Summer Olympics
Sportspeople from Bern
21st-century Swiss people